Stefan Zelger (born 9 September 1995) is an Italian cross-country skier. He competed in the 2018 Winter Olympics.

Cross-country skiing results
All results are sourced from the International Ski Federation (FIS).

Olympic Games

World Championships

World Cup

Season standings

References

1995 births
Living people
Cross-country skiers at the 2018 Winter Olympics
Italian male cross-country skiers
Olympic cross-country skiers of Italy
Sportspeople from Bolzano
Germanophone Italian people
20th-century Italian people
21st-century Italian people